Jonatan Söderström, also known as Cactus, is a Swedish video game developer noted for his unusual and innovative games. He is best known as the co-designer and programmer of Hotline Miami (2012) and Hotline Miami 2: Wrong Number (2015), but had prior to those games developed over 40 small freeware games, many of which were reviewed and lauded even in the mainstream video game press. His game Clean Asia! was nominated for both Excellence In Visual Arts and Excellence in Audio at the Independent Games Festival in 2008. In 2010, he won the IGF's Nuovo Award, which honours unconventional game development, for his puzzler Tuning.

All of Söderström's games prior to Hotline Miami were created with Game Maker, and he was one of the most influential developers in the Game Maker community, together with others like Derek Yu. At the GDC 2009, he delivered a talk called "The Four Hour Game Design", describing the methods he uses in producing his games.

When asked about his game design style in an interview, Söderström replied "Variation can be good, but so can consistency. When I make games I try to keep them unified and to the point, so I don't drift off too far. It's also one of the reasons most of my games are so short, when I feel like I want to turn the game in a new direction I usually explore that new direction in a separate game instead". This further explains Söderström's unusually high output of concentrated games, most of which were developed within a span of two years.

Games 
The games Söderström has created include:

 Ad Nauseam
 Ad Nauseam 2
 BlockOn!
 Burn The Trash
 Clean Asia!
 Decontrologic
 EVAC
 Fractal Fighters
 Fuck Space
 God Came To The Cave
 Hot Throttle
 Hotline Miami
 Hotline Miami 2: Wrong Number
 Illegal Communication
 Insect Invade 2
 Keyboard Drumset Fucking Werewolf
 KrebsWelte
 Krytza
 Life Is A Race!
 Minubeat
 Mondo Agency
 Mondo Medicals
 MSoids
 Ninja Flu
 Norrland
 Precision
 Strings
 Protoganda II
 Psychosomnium
 Retro
 Retro II
 Retro 4
 Saru Ga Daisuki
 Seizuredome
 Shotgun Ninja
 Space Fuck!
 Stallions In America
 Ted's Wet Adventure
 The Birthday
 The Design
 This Is Infinity
 Tuning (winner of the Sublime Experience award at IndieCade in 2009)
 Unholy Stage
 Xoldiers
 xWUNG

References

External links 

 
 DigitalTools Interview

Living people
Swedish video game designers
Video game designers
Swedish designers
1985 births